The Battle of Río San Gabriel, fought on 8 January 1847, was a decisive action of the California campaign of the Mexican–American War and occurred at a ford of the San Gabriel River, at what are today parts of the cities of Whittier, Pico Rivera and Montebello, about ten miles south-east of downtown Los Angeles.

Background
After the Battle of San Pasqual, the battered Army of the West, commanded by General Stephen W. Kearny, went to the headquarters of Commodore Robert F. Stockton at San Diego, California. Stockton's next objective was to recapture Pueblo de Los Angeles. That settlement had been previously captured by Stockton's forces but was left in the command of Captain Archibald Gillespie and had been lost to the Californio militia, commanded by General José María Flores in the Siege of Los Angeles that Fall.  Stockton's force, which included six cannons this time, left San Diego on 28–29 December.

Kearny and Stockton initially disputed the right of command. Although Kearny had superior orders from the United States War Department, he had previously sent most of his troops back to Santa Fe, New Mexico, believing that the war in California had ended, and his remaining force sustained heavy losses at the Battle of San Pasqual. Stockton had a larger force and was familiar with the area, so Kearny did not initially dispute Stockton's command of the campaign to recapture Los Angeles.

Battle

U.S. scouts discovered the Mexican position at a key ford along the San Gabriel River on January 7, 1847. Approaching from the south, Stockton and Kearny planned a crossing for the next day. The U.S. forces had formed into a hollow square with the artillery and baggage in the center. Kearny ordered the artillery unlimbered to cover the crossing, but Stockton countered the order and began to move across the river. The crossing proved to be especially difficult because Flores was in a good position to contest the crossing from the high banks across the river, and the ford had patches of quicksand at the bottom of the knee deep water.

At approximately 2 PM, the Americans formed into a square when two miles from the river with the baggage and cattle in the middle, and sent skirmishers ahead.  Flores attacked the square with horses, which failed, plus his makeshift ammunition and inadequate gunpowder proved to be ineffective. The U.S. officers and men manhandled their cannon across while the forward quarter of the square took cover on the river edge. Stockton personally helped unlimber and direct the artillery, which silenced both Californio cannons.

Kearny led and commanded the assault force while Stockton stayed with the guns. The left flank of the square took a Californio riverbank position and held it against a counterattack from militia lancers shouting "viva Los Californios". Then the whole square charged forward shouting "New Orleans, New Orleans", in honor of Andrew Jackson's victory against Great Britain there that day thirty-one years before. The charge took the heights, and Flores withdrew his smaller force. The battle had lasted an hour and a half, and the battle was decisive in the campaign for control of Los Angeles, and Alta California.

General Kearny's official report of the battle:

Aftermath

Stockton and Kearny stayed on the field overnight and resumed the pursuit the next day, moving west from the San Gabriel River to the Los Angeles Rivers near present-day Vernon, about 4 miles south of Los Angeles. There they defeated Flores' troops at the Battle of La Mesa. On January 10 the U.S. forces reoccupied Los Angeles, and Archibald Gillespie was able to raise the same U.S. Flag over the house which he was forced to bring down a year before during the Siege of Los Angeles.

After Los Angeles and the whole of southern California was secured, the command issue between Stockton and Kearny heated up once again. Stockton, who had been the initial military governor of California, later granted that post to his aide, Lieutenant-Colonel (later General) John C. Fremont. Kearny, based on his more recent orders from the War Department, asserted that post for himself but was initially ignored.

On January 10, 1847, Stockton established his headquarters on Wine Street, now known as Olvera Street, in the pueblo settlement of Ciudad de Los Angeles and assisted in setting up a civil government; that home is still standing as part of the historic area.

Kearny left California on 31 May 1847 for St. Louis, with Fremont, whom he would prefer charges.  Stockton left on 20 June.

The site of the battle is now registered as California Historical Landmark #385. The memorial, marked by a plaque flanked by two cannons, is located at the corner of Washington Blvd. and Bluff Rd. in Montebello. Volunteers in costume re-enact the battle annually.

California Historical Landmark Marker
California Historical Landmark Marker No. 385 at the site reads:

See also
List of conflicts in the United States
Battles of the Mexican–American War
 Captain John Strother Griffin (1816–1898), physician during the battle

References

Further reading
  (indexed at end of volume 24)
Nevin, David; editor, The Mexican War (1978)

External links
Center for Greater Southwestern Studies: "A Continent Divided: The U.S. - Mexico War" — from the University of Texas at Arlington.

Battles of the Conquest of California
1847 in Alta California
San Gabriel River (California)
California Historical Landmarks
History of Los Angeles County, California
San Gabriel, California
Montebello, California
Pico Rivera, California
Whittier, California
United States Marine Corps in the 18th and 19th centuries
January 1847 events
1847 in the Mexican-American War